The 1920 Western State Normal Hilltoppers football team represented Western State Normal School (later renamed Western Michigan University) as an independent during the 1920 college football season.  In their 14th season under head coach William H. Spaulding, the Hilltoppers compiled a 3–4 record and were outscored by their opponents, 131 to 119. End Grant Westgate was the team captain.

Schedule

References

Western State Normal
Western Michigan Broncos football seasons
Western State Normal Hilltoppers football